Iowa World Tour was a worldwide concert tour in 2001 and 2002 headlined by Slipknot in support of their second studio album Iowa.

Setlists

Set list

Kill The Industry
Kill The Industry was a leg of the Iowa World Tour in Europe. Musicians that accompanied the tour include Static-X, Mudvayne, Amen and Raging Speedhorn. The band was supposed to play at Dynamo Open Air, but the festival was cancelled. As a result, this date was replaced by an headlining show in 's-Hertogenbosch with some bands supposed to play at Dynamo that day opening. However, the band also cancelled their appearance at Rock am Ring and Rock im Park.

Ozzfest 2001
Slipknot joined the 2001 Ozzfest, performing on the main stage after Papa Roach and before Marilyn Manson.

Pledge of Allegiance

The Pledge of Allegiance Tour was a leg co-headlined by the heavy metal band System of a Down. Both groups used the tour as a promotion for their new albums.

The band played 27 shows all over the United States and had support from Rammstein, American Head Charge, Mudvayne and No One. The tour was scheduled to start on September 14 but was postponed for a week due to the terrorist attacks on September 11, 2001, 5 dates were rescheduled and 4 dates were cancelled, the rest of the dates went ahead as originally scheduled.

Originally, No One were to open the tour and American Head Charge was to take their set for the second half of the tour. Due to the terrorist attacks, Mudvayne dropped off the tour leaving an open set on October 2. To fill the gap, American Head Charge came onto the tour early and No One stayed on for the entire tour.

A Pledge of Allegiance CD, reported by Metal Hammer to have been largely recorded at the Rosemont date in October, includes SOAD's 'Chop Suey!', 'Bounce' and 'Toxicity', Slipknot's 'People = Shit', 'The Heretic Anthem' and 'New Abortion', Mudvayne's 'Under My Skin' and 'Pharmaecopia', American Head Charge's 'Seamless' and No One's 'My Release'. However, complained Malcolm Dome, "Mudvayne's two tracks… are taken from their DVD L(ive) D(osage) 50: Live in Peoria. And, for reasons best known to themselves, Rammstein are completely absent. So this is far from being the complete live documentation of the tour many would have hoped and liked to experience on the CD."

Bands:

 System of a Down
 Slipknot
 Rammstein (dropped from the tour on 24th October)
 Mudvayne (dropped from the tour on 30th September due to unknown reasons)
 No One 
 American Head Charge (started 5th October. dropped from the last show of the tour due to tour with Slayer)

Cancelled headlining US leg
The band was supposed to play their own headlining shows after the Pledge of Allegiance Tour, with 40 Below Summer as direct support. However, this portion of the tour ended up being cancelled just nine days after its announcement, due to the wife of the band's percussionist, Shawn Crahan, undergoing surgery for Crohn's disease, which forced Crahan to not participate in Slipknot's live performances. However, the group announced that they plan to go ahead with their upcoming European tour, which had its start date moved ahead to January 2002.

European leg
The European Iowa Tour was intended to begin around the September 11 attacks, but because of the incident, the tour was postponed to February 2002.

Slipknot arrived in Helsinki, Finland for a performance on January 20, 2002 to kick off the European Iowa Tour, which was its penultimate leg. On February 16, 2002, Slipknot performed at the London Arena, the show they filmed for their live DVD Disasterpieces, released November 22 of the same year. Despite significant tabloid coverage, the European Iowa Tour was not sold out.

Japanese leg
The Japanese leg kicked off on March 18, 2002 at the Rainbow Hall in Nagoya. The tour is part of a worldwide tour to promote Iowa; the Japan Iowa Tour was preceded by the European Iowa Tour.

European Open Air Leg
This leg consisted of several festival appearances across Europe, beginning with the Festival Ilha Do Ermal on August 20, 2002, and ending with an appearance at the 2 Days a Week Festival in Austria. They also notably performed at the 2002 Reading and Leeds Festivals in the United Kingdom.

Because of the shorter set times available at festivals, "Gently" and "New Abortion" were removed from the setlist on this leg.

References

Slipknot (band) concert tours
2001 concert tours
2002 concert tours